Drosera citrina is a pygmy sundew, a type of carnivorous plant. It is native to Western Australia. The Latin specific epithet citrina means "lemon coloured", refrring to the colour of the flowers. It is closely related to Drosera nivea, which was considered a variety of D. citrina in the past called Drosera citrina var. nivea

Reproduction
Drosera citrina can reproduce both sexually and asexually. They produce flowers which are lemon yellow or occasionally white. They also reproduce asexually by producing gemmae (singular gemma) : modified leaves which can grow into a genetically identical individual to the parent plant.

Uses
Drosera citrina is used as an ornamental plant and cultivated by horticulturalists and carnivorous plant enthusiasts.

See also
 List of Drosera species

References

citrina
Flora of Australia
Plants described in 1992